Acanthaeschna victoria, the thylacine darner, is a species of Australian dragonfly in the family Telephlebiidae. 
It is the only member of the genus Acanthaeschna. 
Acanthaeschna victoria is rare and endemic to coastal areas of both southern and northern New South Wales as well as southern Queensland. Its natural habitat is intertidal marshes. It is threatened by habitat loss.

Acanthaeschna victoria is a large, brown dragonfly with a distinctive dark band on the side of its body that runs from the head to the abdomen.
It has clear wings with a small dark stain at the nodus, the joint near the middle of the leading edge of each wing.

Gallery

References

Telephlebiidae
Odonata of Australia
Insects of Australia
Endemic fauna of Australia
Taxa named by René Martin
Insects described in 1901
Taxonomy articles created by Polbot